Jean Joseph Marc Vaubourgoin (19 March 1907 in Caudéran (today a western neighbourhood of Bordeaux) – 1 April 1983 in the 10th arrondissement of Paris) was a 20th-century French composer.

Biography 
Marc Vaubourgoin's father, Julien Fernand Vaubourgoin, a composer and teacher, gave him his first music lessons. Marc entered the Conservatoire de Bordeaux and then completed his studies at the Conservatoire de Paris with André Gedalge, Noël Gallon (counterpoint and fugue), Charles-Marie Widor and Paul Dukas (composition). In 1930, he won the 2nd Grand Prix de Rome for his cantata Actéon.

He directed the Conservatoire de Nantes from 1937 to 1943, then became conductor for the Radiodiffusion française. In 1954, he became director of the musicology department of the ORTF. As such, he was interested in exhuming works by composers from the 18th century that had been forgotten until then, such as Hippolyte et Aricie by Jean-Philippe Rameau, while baroque music was not yet in fashion.

Marc Vaubourgoin had two sons who also distinguished themselves in the field of the Arts: Jean-Raphaël Vaubourgoin, an architect and Thierry Vaubourgoin, a painter.

Works 
 Impressions de Cornouaille:
 Saint-Michel de Braspartz
 Le marais sous la lune d’avril
 Confort. La roue du bonheur
Trois Chansons de Clément Marot for Choir a cappella
Conte de Noël, Ballet after René Dumesnil
 Wind quintet (1932)
 Trio for oboe, clarinet and bassoon (1936)
 Symphonie n°1 (1938)
 Prélude, Fanfare et Danse, for orchestra (1945)
 Symphonie n°2 (1955)
 Piano sonata (1967)
 Concerto for bassoon (1964)
 Concerto for piano
 Introduction, variation et rondeau for wood quartet soloists (flute, oboe, clarinet and bassoon) and orchestra
 Concerto for harpsichord (1968)
 Conte de Noël, ballet (unpublished)
 Douze canons for 2 bassoons (1978)

References

External links 
 [http://www.musimem.com/prix-rome-1930-1939.htm Portrait de Marc Vaubourgoin sur le site Prix de Rome 1930-1939]
 Marc Vaubourgoin - Concerto pour Basson et Orchestre on YouTube 

20th-century French composers
Prix de Rome for composition
1907 births
Musicians from Bordeaux
1983 deaths